Macon County Courthouse is a historic county courthouse in downtown Tuskegee, Alabama, county seat of Macon County, Alabama. A brick courthouse was constructed in the middle of the 19th century, replacing wooden structures used earlier. The current courthouse, an example of Romanesque Revival architecture, was designed by J.W. Golucke and built in 1905 (completed in 1906). It includes gargoyles. A monument to confederate soldiers is located nearby. The courthouse was listed on the National Register of Historic Places on November 17, 1978.

See also
List of county courthouses in Alabama

References

National Register of Historic Places in Macon County, Alabama
County courthouses in Alabama
Courthouses on the National Register of Historic Places in Alabama
Government buildings completed in 1906
Romanesque Revival architecture in Alabama
1906 establishments in Alabama